DTK is an initialism that may refer to

 Developer Transition Kit, Apple's first ARM-based Macintosh computer for developers
 Dell OpenManage Deployment Toolkit
 Democratic Society Congress (Demokratik Toplum Kongresi), a pro-Kurdish NGO in Turkey
 Deutsche Bank Contingent Capital Trust III, listed as DTK on the New York Stock Exchange
 Diamond Trust Bank Group, traded as DTK on the Nairobi Securities Exchange
 Dunia Tanpa Koma, a TV series in Indonesia
 Duttapukur railway station (station code DTK), West Bengal, India
 DTK Computer, a defunct Taiwanese computer hardware company
 ISO 639:dtk, the Tomo Kan dialect of Western Plains Dogon